Black Talon is a brand of hollow-point pistol and rifle ammunition introduced in 1991 by Winchester, primarily intended for law enforcement and personal defense use. Black Talon rounds were known for the unique construction of the bullet and its sharp petal shape after expansion following impact with tissue or other wet media. Black Talon ammunition was produced in the following calibers: 9mm Luger, 10mm Auto, .40 S&W, .45 ACP, .357 Magnum, .44 Magnum, .300 Winchester Magnum, .308 Winchester, .338 Winchester Magnum, and .30-06 Springfield.

Black Talon was controversial, and Winchester discontinued sales to the general public in 1993 and ceased manufacture in 2000.

Overview
The Black Talon handgun bullet (from the resemblance of the opened segments to the talons or claws of a bird of prey) is a jacketed hollow-point bullet with perforations designed to expose sharp edges upon expansion. The bullet included a Lubalox coating, a proprietary oxide process. Though widely misreported to be Teflon, molybdenum disulfide, or wax, the ammo has an unusual black appearance compared to other copper-jacketed or lead bullets. The black appearance was due to the oxidized copper jacket. This Lubalox coating was to protect the barrel rifling, and did not give the bullet armor-piercing capabilities. This coating is still widely used on many of Winchester's rifle bullets today.<ref>"Biting the Bullets", Op/ED in The Washington Post'''', January 14, 1995.</ref>

The bullet was designed in 1991 under the supervision of Alan Corzine, who at that time was VP of research and development for Winchester. The round quickly developed a reputation as a very effective expanding bullet. The alleged armor-piercing (AP) notion is urban legend, and was a result of media hyperbole (perhaps confusing "Talon" with the "Teflon" that coated KTW AP bullets)—rather than test or field data from actual shootings considering the short time it was on the market.  Col Leonard J. Supenski of the Baltimore County police department said "It has the stopping power that police officers need and it is less likely to ricochet or go through the bad guy," something that could be said of any reliably expanding hollow-point. Despite its unique design, the Black Talon was found to be comparable in performance to conventional hollow-points.

The first shooting which brought critical media attention to Black Talon was by Gian Luigi Ferri, who used Black Talon and other ammunition to shoot 15 people at a San Francisco law office in 1993; nine of whom died (the 101 California Street shootings). Physician Boyd Stevens, the San Francisco Medical Examiner who performed the autopsies, later reported at the 1994 International Wound Ballistics Association's conference in Sacramento that the wound trauma caused by Black Talons was unremarkable and that all victims died due to penetration of a vital structure.

The rifle version did not share the handgun bullet's barbed petal design and was basically a solid copper hollow-point with a hollowed out rear shank containing a lead core in a steel liner to prevent jacket rupture thus maintaining necessary penetration in tough game. This ammunition line was renamed Fail Safe.

 Response 
Critics alleged the ammunition caused unnecessary physical damage."These are bullets that are strictly used to maim and kill",  "In Person; On the Other Side of the Divide", by Debbie Galant, The New York Times, March 17, 1996. Some medical personnel were concerned that the sharp barb-like tips could potentially cause tears in the surgical gloves and hands of the medical workers, exposing them to greater risk of infection, however there are no documented reports of this actually happening. 

Colin Ferguson used Black Talon ammunition for his Ruger P89 9×19mm pistol during a 1993 shooting incident. In 1996 a lawsuit was subsequently filed by one of the victim's family members (McCarthy v. Sturm, Ruger and Co., Inc., 916 F.Supp. 366 (S.D.N.Y., 1996)) claiming that Olin Corp. should be liable for the shooting spree based on the design, manufacture, marketing, and sale of Black Talon ammunition. The claims against Olin were dismissed because it was held that the plaintiff could not prevail because there were no defects in manufacturing, design, or in warnings – the bullets "functioned exactly as designed".

In 1993 Winchester removed the ammunition from public sale, but at no time was Black Talon ammunition uniformly prohibited by US law.

Current status

Winchester discontinued the Black Talon line completely in 2000. The “Ranger SXT” ammunition sold later by Winchester is very similar to the Black Talon though without the black Lubalox coating on the bullet.  On internet forums, gun enthusiasts frequently joke that that SXT stands for "Same eXact Thing", though the official branding is “Supreme eXpansion Technology”. However, there are differences in the anatomy of the bullets which become apparent when carefully examined side by side. The hollow point cavity dimensions and angles of the meplat were altered to enhance reliability of expansion, though the basic "reverse taper" design pioneered by the Black Talon was retained.  This "reverse taper" refers to the bullet's jacket being thicker at the tip than toward the base, enhancing rigidity which allows the sharp petals to remain largely perpendicular to the wound path, unlike traditional designs where the expanding jacket petals would peel back almost completely behind the expanded lead mushroom.  This difference is obvious after firing into ballistic gelatin.
In 2007 Winchester updated their Ranger SXT line and renamed it Ranger T-Series.  Besides further dimensional changes to the hollow point for reliable expansion, the distinctive perpendicular petals were made longer yet more rounded at the tips to retain stiffness.

PDX1
In 2009, Winchester-Olin released a new hollow point bullet in its Supreme Elite line of handgun ammunition called the Bonded PDX1. It is similar to the Ranger SXT series and the older Black Talon design in its structure, and is available in several calibers and loadings. The most obvious difference from the SXT is that the bonded design, meant to maintain structural integrity through difficult intermediate barriers like auto-glass, largely prevents the sharp petals from peeling away from the lead core and fully protruding into the wound track.  The .40 S&W PDX1 cartridge is available for purchase by civilian shooters and was the primary service ammunition of the FBI until 2017 when they switched to the Hornady Critical Duty line.

Use in Reeva Steenkamp shooting
In March 2014, The Guardian newspaper reported that South African paralympic athlete Oscar Pistorius had shot to death his girlfriend Reeva Steenkamp on Valentine's Day the previous year with four Black Talons fired from a 9mm pistol. Describing the round, South African police ballistics expert Captain Christian Mangena explained:

It hits the target, it opens up, it creates six talons, and these talons are sharp. It cuts through the organs of a human being.

 U.S. Army procurement 
Following the United States Army's selection of the SIG Sauer P320-derived M17 pistol in the Modular Handgun System competition, the Army announced two new 9mm rounds would be adopted alongside the gun, the M1152 Ball, an 115 grain full metal jacket round "for use against enemy personnel, for training, and for force protection", and the M1153 Special Purpose, a 147 grain jacketed hollow point round "for use in situations where limited over-penetration of targets is necessary to reduce collateral damage." Many in the firearms community noted the latter hollow point round is conspicuously similar to the Ranger T/ Black Talon, in response Winchester largely avoided the question, saying that despite obvious similarities the round was designed to "maximize performance based on the government specification set out in the request for proposal." Both the round and the firearm have subsequently been adopted by all branches of the United States Armed Forces, except for the Coast Guard.

 In popular culture 
A fictionalized version of the Black Talon bullet called the "Black Death" is utilized by Hank Schrader to kill Marco Salamanca in the Breaking Bad episode "One Minute".

The Black Talon bullet is referenced in The Mountain Goats album Bleed Out'', in the track "First Blood".

See also
 Full metal jacket bullet
 Jacketed hollow point
 Soft point bullet
 Terminal ballistics

References

External links 
 

Cartridge families
Ammunition
Projectiles
Paramilitary cartridges